Mycobacterium rhodesiae is a species of Mycobacterium.

References

External links
Type strain of Mycobacterium rhodesiae at BacDive -  the Bacterial Diversity Metadatabase

rhodesiae
Bacteria described in 1981